Mynydd Mawr (Welsh for big mountain) is a mountain in North Wales. Mynydd Mawr may also refer to
Llanarmon Mynydd Mawr, an isolated rural parish in Powys, Wales
Llanelli and Mynydd Mawr Railway, a heritage railway aiming to re-instate the Llanelly and Mynydd Mawr Railway that closed in 1989
Llanelly and Mynydd Mawr Railway
Ras Mynydd Mawr, an annual running race from Y Fron up the hill Mynydd Mawr
Mynydd Mawr, Carmarthenshire, a prominent hill that gives its name to the area around it.